The posterior labial veins are veins which drain to the vesical venous plexus.

External links
 https://web.archive.org/web/20071024000415/http://anatomy.med.umich.edu/anatomytables/veins_pelvis_perineum.html

Veins of the torso